Mortenhals or Mortenshals is a village in Balsfjord Municipality in Troms og Finnmark county, Norway. The village is located along the Malangen fjord, across the fjord from Rossfjordstraumen. Malangen Church is located here. This village was the administrative centre of the old municipality of Malangen which existed from 1871 until 1964.

References

Villages in Troms
Balsfjord
Populated places of Arctic Norway